is a Japanese manga artist known as the creator of the Hamtaro franchise. Kawai originally created Hamtaro as storybooks for children first published in 1997 and adapted into an anime television series in Japan in July 2000.

Hamtaro is about a little hamster and his friends. Hamtaro has gained great popularity and was made into an anime series and a line of merchandising. However, the animated show has since been cancelled.

Kawai has had a say in the message that Hamtaro promoted, which was non-violence, teamwork, cooperation and sharing. 

Hamtaro has also been made into many different games for Nintendo handheld systems such as the Game Boy Color, Game Boy Advance and Nintendo DS.

Other than Hamtaro, Ritsuko Kawai has created other shōjo manga, serialized in Ciao magazine.

References

External links

 

1964 births
Living people
Japanese writers
People from Toyonaka, Osaka